Just Right is the third extended play by South Korean boy band Got7. It was released on July 13, 2015. The song "Just Right (딱 좋아)" was used to promote the EP. Members JB, Mark and Jackson participated in the lyric making, rap making, in a total of 2 songs.

Track listing

Chart performance

Album chart

Singles
"Just Right"

Sales

References 

2015 EPs
Dance-pop EPs
Korean-language EPs
JYP Entertainment EPs
Genie Music EPs
Got7 EPs